Burrillville is a town in Providence County, Rhode Island, United States. The population was 16,158 at the 2020 census.

It was incorporated as an independent municipality on November 17, 1806 when the Rhode Island General Assembly authorized the residents of then North Glocester to elect its own officers.  The town was named for 19th century United States senator James Burrill, Jr. who was then the Rhode Island Attorney General.

History
Burrillville was probably first settled sometime around 1662, when the first Europeans began to settle the Nipmuc lands. The Town was originally a part of Glocester, Rhode Island. John Smith and members of the Saulsbury family were among the earliest settlers. Samuel Willard (physician) treated many smallpox victims in South Uxbridge and Glocester (Burrillville), and he had the scars to prove it. Later Boundary disputes with Massachusetts and Glocester reduced this land area by the mid-19th century. Joktan Putnam was the first town moderator. The Nipmuc word for snake was rendered "askug" by Roger Williams in his A Key Into the Language of America, and "askoog" by the Reverend John Eliot in his Algonquian translation of the Bible. Burrillville's principal village, Pascoag, named after the stream upon which it is located, probably derives from this Algonquian root. Gradually in the early-to-mid-19th century, the various mills and villages took shape such as Harris mills, and the village of Harrisville, Mapleville mills, Oakland mills etc. Buck Hill was known for a colorful band of counterfeiters. The town is today part of the Blackstone River Valley National Heritage Corridor, New England's, historic National Park area. Burrillville was home to many historic mills, many of which have either been burned, demolished, abandoned or renovated. The Stillwater Mill Complex in Harrisville is home to the Clocktower apartments, which used to be the old Tinkham textile mills (factual content requested). The site is also home to the recently built Jesse Smith Library.

Until 1846 the Sherman Farm was owned by the family. The farmhouse had 32 rooms.

Geography
According to the United States Census Bureau, the town has a total area of 57.2 square miles (148.0 km2), of which, 55.6 square miles (143.9 km2) of it is land and 1.6 square miles (4.1 km2) of it (2.76%) is water.

Villages
Burrillville is further divided into villages: Glendale, Harrisville, Mapleville, Nasonville, Oakland, and Pascoag.

Climate

Demographics

As of the census of 2000, there were 15,796 people, 5,559 households, and 4,252 families residing in the town. The racial makeup of the town was 98.56% White, 0.22% African American, 0.20% Native American, 0.22% Asian, 0.03% Pacific Islander, 0.25% from other races, and 0.53% from two or more races. Hispanic or Latino of any race were 0.84% of the population.

There were 5,559 households, out of which 36.6% had children under the age of 18 living with them, 62.8% were married couples living together, 9.7% had a female householder with no husband present, and 23.5% were non-families. Of all households 18.8% were made up of individuals, and 7.6% had someone living alone who was 65 years of age or older.  The average household size was 2.75 and the average family size was 3.15.

In the town, the population was spread out, with 25.6% under the age of 18, 7.7% from 18 to 24, 31.7% from 25 to 44, 23.6% from 45 to 64, and 11.4% who were 65 years of age or older.  The median age was 38 years. For every 100 females, there were 96.3 males.  For every 100 females age 18 and over, there were 92.5 males.

The median income for a household in the town was $52,587, and the median income for a family was $58,979. Males had a median income of $39,839 versus $28,835 for females. The per capita income for the town was $21,096.  About 3.7% of families and 6.1% of the population were below the poverty line, including 6.0% of those under age 18 and 9.4% of those age 65 or over.

Government

In the Rhode Island Senate, Burrillville is a part of the 23rd District and is currently represented by Republican Jessica De La Cruz. At the federal level in the U.S. House of Representatives, Burrillville is in Rhode Island's 2nd congressional district, which is currently represented by Democrat James R. Langevin.

In presidential elections, Burrillville has traditionally leaned Democratic; however, in 2016, Donald Trump became the first Republican to win the town in over three decades when he defeated former U.S. Secretary of State Hillary Clinton by approximately 22 points.

Burrillville was also one of seven towns in Rhode Island where independent candidate Ross Perot finished in second place during the 1992 presidential election. Perot received 2,018 votes (31.47 percent) behind Bill Clinton's 2,454 votes (38.27 percent) and ahead of George H. W. Bush's 1,880 (29.32 percent).

Notable people

 Vice Admiral Walter E. Carter Jr., naval flight officer and President of the U.S. Naval War College
 Oscar Lapham, U.S. Congressman

 Henry Francis Walling, cartographer

National Historic Register sites
Bridgeton School (1897)
Harrisville Historic District
Moses Taft House (Burrillville, Rhode Island) (1786)
Oakland Historic District
Pascoag Grammar School (1917)

See also

References

Further reading
 History of the State of Rhode Island with Illustrations, Albert J. Wright, Printer No. 79 Mille Street, corner of Federal, Boston. Hong, Wade & Co., Philadelphia 1878.

External links

 
 Town of Burrillville official website
 "History of Burrillville"—History of the State of Rhode Island with Illustrations
 Burrillville History Site by Town Historian Patricia Mehrtens
 Valley Sites—Glocester and Burrilville—Blackstone River Valley National Heritage Corridor
 Nipmuck Nation website—Nipmuck tribe extended into what is today Burrilville
	

 
Providence metropolitan area
Towns in Providence County, Rhode Island
Towns in Rhode Island